Mud Lake is a lake in Greater Madawaska, Renfrew County in Eastern Ontario, Canada. It is in geographic Blithfield Township, and is part of the Saint Lawrence River drainage basin.

The lake has no inflows. The primary outflow is an unnamed creek at the north, which flows via the Madawaska River, and the Ottawa River to the Saint Lawrence River.

See also
List of lakes in Ontario

References

Lakes of Renfrew County